Bacopa is a genus of 70–100 aquatic plants belonging to the family Plantaginaceae. It is commonly known as waterhyssop (or water hyssop, though this is more misleading as Bacopa is not very closely related to hyssop but simply has a somewhat similar appearance).

Description

They are annual or perennial, with decumbent or erect stems. The leaves are opposite or whorled, and sessile. The leaf blade is regular, round to linear, and the venation is palmate or pinnate. Its stems are hairy or smooth. The flowers are produced solitary or in pairs from leaf axils, usually radially symmetrical, with five sepals and five petals, and they are usually white, blue, or purple. Dispersal and propagation is by seeds and stem fragments. Crushed leaves have a distinctive 'lemon' scent.

Habitat and range
Bacopa species are found in tropical and subtropical regions of the world, particularly the Americas. A few are regarded as weeds and excess stock should not be dumped in warmer regions. Most grow in moist amphibious conditions, though some like B. myriophylloides seem to be wholly aquatic.

Uses
Bacopa monnieri is used in Ayurvedic medicine.  Preliminary clinical research found that the herb may improve cognition.

Cultivation
Some of these species are commonly used in freshwater aquariums and ponds in warmer climates. Most are easy to grow and will tolerate a wide range of conditions. B. monnieri will tolerate brackish water up to 15 ppt, due to specialized adaptations that enable it to survive in saline environments. Algal infestation can be a problem in brighter lighting conditions.

Selected species

Formerly placed here
Mecardonia procumbens (Mill.) Small (as B. procumbens (Mill.) Greenm.)

See also
Chaenostoma cordatum syn. Sutera cordata, a plant also known by the obsolete name Bacopa.

References

Plantaginaceae
Plantaginaceae genera
Plants used in Ayurveda
Freshwater plants
Pantropical flora
Taxa named by Jean Baptiste Christian Fusée-Aublet